Gödel, Escher, Bach: an Eternal Golden Braid, also known as GEB, is a 1979 book by Douglas Hofstadter.
By exploring common themes in the lives and works of logician Kurt Gödel, artist M. C. Escher, and composer Johann Sebastian Bach, the book expounds concepts fundamental to mathematics, symmetry, and intelligence. Through short stories, illustrations, and analysis, the book discusses how systems can acquire meaningful context despite being made of "meaningless" elements. It also discusses self-reference and formal rules, isomorphism, what it means to communicate, how knowledge can be represented and stored, the methods and limitations of symbolic representation, and even the fundamental notion of "meaning" itself.

In response to confusion over the book's theme, Hofstadter emphasized that Gödel, Escher, Bach is not about the relationships of mathematics, art, and music—but rather about how cognition emerges from hidden neurological mechanisms. One point in the book presents an analogy about how individual neurons in the brain coordinate to create a unified sense of a coherent mind by comparing it to the social organization displayed in a colony of ants.

Gödel, Escher, Bach won the Pulitzer Prize for general non-fiction and the National Book Award for Science Hardcover.

Structure

Gödel, Escher, Bach takes the form of interweaving narratives. The main chapters alternate with dialogues between imaginary characters, usually Achilles and the tortoise, first used by Zeno of Elea and later by Lewis Carroll in "What the Tortoise Said to Achilles". These origins are related in the first two dialogues, and later ones introduce new characters such as the Crab. These narratives frequently dip into self-reference and metafiction.

Word play also features prominently in the work. Puns are occasionally used to connect ideas, such as "the Magnificrab, Indeed" with Bach's Magnificat in D; "SHRDLU, Toy of Man's Designing" with Bach's Jesu, Joy of Man's Desiring; and "Typographical Number Theory", or "TNT", which inevitably reacts explosively when it attempts to make statements about itself. One dialogue contains a story about a genie (from the Arabic "Djinn") and various "tonics" (of both the liquid and musical varieties), which is titled "Djinn and Tonic".

One dialogue in the book is written in the form of a crab canon, in which every line before the midpoint corresponds to an identical line past the midpoint. The conversation still makes sense due to uses of common phrases that can be used as either greetings or farewells ("Good day") and the positioning of lines that double as an answer to a question in the next line. Another is a sloth canon, where one character repeats the lines of another, but slower and negated.

Themes

The book contains many instances of recursion and self-reference, where objects and ideas speak about or refer back to themselves. One is Quining, a term Hofstadter invented in homage to Willard Van Orman Quine, referring to programs that produce their own source code. Another is the presence of a fictional author in the index, Egbert B. Gebstadter, a man with initials E, G, and B and a surname that partially matches Hofstadter. A phonograph dubbed "Record Player X" destroys itself by playing a record titled I Cannot Be Played on Record Player X (an analogy to Gödel's incompleteness theorems), an examination of canon form in music, and a discussion of Escher's lithograph of two hands drawing each other. To describe such self-referencing objects, Hofstadter coins the term "strange loop"—a concept he examines in more depth in his follow-up book I Am a Strange Loop. To escape many of the logical contradictions brought about by these self-referencing objects, Hofstadter discusses Zen koans. He attempts to show readers how to perceive reality outside their own experience and embrace such paradoxical questions by rejecting the premise—a strategy also called "unasking".

Elements of computer science such as call stacks are also discussed in Gödel, Escher, Bach, as one dialogue describes the adventures of Achilles and the Tortoise as they make use of "pushing potion" and "popping tonic" involving entering and leaving different layers of reality. The same dialogue has a genie with a lamp containing another genie with another lamp and so on. Subsequent sections discuss the basic tenets of logic, self-referring statements, ("typeless") systems, and even programming. Hofstadter further creates BlooP and FlooP, two simple programming languages, to illustrate his point.

Puzzles

The book is filled with puzzles, including Hofstadter's MU puzzle, which contrasts reasoning within a defined logical system with reasoning about that system. Another example can be found in the chapter titled Contracrostipunctus, which combines the words acrostic and contrapunctus (counterpoint). In this dialogue between Achilles and the Tortoise, the author hints that there is a contrapunctal acrostic in the chapter that refers both to the author (Hofstadter) and Bach. This can be spelled out by taking the first word of each paragraph, to reveal "Hofstadter's Contracrostipunctus Acrostically Backwards Spells J. S. Bach". The second acrostic is found by taking the first letters of the words of the first, and reading them backwards to get "J S Bach", as the acrostic sentence self-referentially states.

Reception and impact

Gödel, Escher, Bach won the Pulitzer Prize for general non-fiction and the National Book Award for Science Hardcover.

Martin Gardner's July 1979 column in Scientific American stated, "Every few decades, an unknown author brings out a book of such depth, clarity, range, wit, beauty and originality that it is recognized at once as a major literary event."

For Summer 2007, the Massachusetts Institute of Technology created an online course for high school students built around the book.

In its February 19, 2010 investigative summary on the 2001 anthrax attacks, the Federal Bureau of Investigation suggested that Bruce Edwards Ivins was inspired by the book to hide secret codes based upon nucleotide sequences in the anthrax-laced letters he allegedly sent in September and October 2001, using bold letters, as suggested on page 404 of the book. It was also suggested that he attempted to hide the book from investigators by throwing it in the trash.

In 2019, British mathematician Marcus du Sautoy curated a series of events at London's Barbican Centre to celebrate the book's fortieth anniversary.

Translation

Hofstadter claims the idea of translating his book "never crossed [his] mind" when he was writing it—but when his publisher brought it up, he was "very excited about seeing [the] book in other languages, especially… French." He knew, however, that "there were a million issues to consider" when translating, since the book relies not only on word-play, but on "structural puns" as well—writing where the form and content of the work mirror each other (such as the "Crab canon" dialogue, which reads almost exactly the same forwards as backwards).

Hofstadter gives an example of translation trouble in the paragraph "Mr. Tortoise, Meet Madame Tortue", saying translators "instantly ran headlong into the conflict between the feminine gender of the French noun tortue and the masculinity of my character, the Tortoise." Hofstadter agreed to the translators' suggestions of naming the French character Madame Tortue, and the Italian version Signorina Tartaruga. Because of other troubles translators might have retaining meaning, Hofstadter "painstakingly went through every sentence of Gödel, Escher, Bach, annotating a copy for translators into any language that might be targeted."

Translation also gave Hofstadter a way to add new meaning and puns. For instance, in Chinese, the subtitle is not a translation of an Eternal Golden Braid, but a seemingly unrelated phrase Jí Yì Bì (集异璧, literally "collection of exotic jades"), which is homophonic to GEB in Chinese. Some material regarding this interplay is in Hofstadter's later book, Le Ton beau de Marot, which is mainly about translation.

Editions

See also

 Chinese room
 Church–Turing thesis
 Collatz conjecture
 Fractal
 Heterarchy
 Indra's net
 Isomorphism
 John Lucas (philosopher)
 Meta
 Mind–body problem
 Neural correlates of consciousness
 Typographical Number Theory

Notes

References

External links
 
 Video lectures from a summer GEB seminar for high schoolers, MIT OpenCourseWare
 Mårten's GEB site
 Class about GEB, at the University of Michigan
 Java 3D game based on the GEB triplets

1979 non-fiction books
Basic Books books
Books about consciousness
Books by Douglas Hofstadter
Cognitive science literature
Cultural depictions of Johann Sebastian Bach
Dialogues
English-language books
M. C. Escher
Mathematics books
National Book Award-winning works
Philosophy books
Pulitzer Prize for General Non-Fiction-winning works
Puzzle books